This is an incomplete list of William Merritt Chase artwork and consists of works (mostly paintings, but also etchings) listed in three different ways:
 Alphabetically (by the names that museums call their works)
 Chronologically
 By location

The alphabetical list aids in quickly finding information about that work and provides additional information on some individual works; the chronological listing helps trace the artist's development; the location list helps readers discover where they can see Chase's work first-hand.

Alphabetical listing

A-D

 The Blue Kimono, 1914, Philbrook Museum of Art, Tulsa, Oklahoma
One of a number of Chase's paintings with Oriental motifs and inspired by Diego Velázquez and seventeenth-century Dutch masters, a fleeting moment is captured with the model striking a "studious yet captured pose", according to the painting's description at the Philbrook Museum of Art Web site. The work features a "flourish of contours, stunning colors, decorative patterns and broad, broken brushwork". Oriental decorative and design elements are incorporated, perhaps showing the influence of Chase's contemporaries, James Abbott McNeill Whistler and John Singer Sargent.

Did You Speak to Me?, 1897, Butler Institute of American Art, Youngstown, Ohio
The painting focuses on the girl's implied movement (she has just turned around from looking at one of the paintings), by rendering her in greater detail than the objects around her. The girl is Alice Dieudonne, Chase's daughter, then 10 years old, at his studio at Shinnecock Hills on Long Island. Her bracelets and gold hair band suggest genteel, graceful prosperity, and it has been said that the paintings also suggest it, although Chase at that point had some difficulty maintaining his lifestyle. The painting captures "a casual image of life suspended in time which, while looking effortless and unpremeditated, was actually carefully composed to reflect the movement of real people in real life situations." Chase learned much of this from French Impressionists. The artist was also enamored of the Dutch painter Frans Hals, who also strove to capture moments in time.

E-K

L-N

Mother and Child (The First Portrait), c. 1888, Museum of Fine Arts, Houston, Texas
Chase paints his daughter, holding a coral whistle, and her mother, wearing a Japanese-inspired costume. The black tones of the kimono and the background reflect Chase's experiments with delicate tonal harmonies, which contrast sharply with the white of the child's clothing and the red near the mother's neck. One critic wrote of " . . . the tingling pleasure that one receives from the one note of vivid scarlet that cuts through this quiet harmony like a knife . . .".

O-R

Portrait of Master Otis Barton and his Grandfather, 1903, Currier Museum of Art, Manchester, New Hampshire
Both figures look out at the viewer with composed expressions, as if they are conscious of the dignity of their pose. Yet the double portrait shows signs of a natural bond, especially the intertwined hands, suggesting affection between the grandfather and grandson, who share the same name. Chase combined a fashionable painting style of loose brushwork and dark palette with conventions of formal portraiture to create portraits that Americans with money would want. Scattered magazines on the floor and similar details add touches of authenticity that moderate the artificiality of the formal portrait.

S

Self-portrait: The Artist in his Studio, Richmond Art Museum, Richmond, Indiana
The painting was commissioned for the Richmond Art Museum, where it now hangs. Chase painted himself in his studio at his easel, holding his artist palette and with a blank canvas before him. In a letter to the museum director, Chase wrote: "I painted that picture for you people in Richmond. I thought you deserved something good. I have been interested in what you have been doing in the west for art." He added that the blank canvas in the picture was " the great picture I am going to paint someday".

Self Portrait, c. 1914, Detroit Institute of Arts, Michigan
The beribboned pince-nez eyeglasses, the carnation in his lapel and his cravat were all signature elements of Chase's typical dress and were caricatured in the press. When the Detroit Institute of Arts bought the painting in 1916, the museum stated "As a likeness it reproduces the artist as his many friends and pupils know him". The painting also exemplifies his technique, with "sure, quick brushwork". The painting has not been lined, so the original impasto (build up of paint) can be seen, especially on the forehead. The work was used to illustrate a reprint of a 1916 speech Chase made to the American Federation of Arts. The portrait shows Chase, head and shoulders, in a quarter turn to the right, head turned toward the viewer, his right side somewhat in shadow, looking directly at the viewer, eyebrows crossed. He wears a jet black jacket (and sits in front of a jet black background) with very white collar and cravat, along with a very delicate white carnation (carefully painted) in his lapel.

Still Life Urns and Red Peppers, c. 1895, Sheldon Swope Art Museum, Terre Haute, Indiana
An example of Chase's "Munich-school" style, "characterized by bravura brushwork, heavy impasto, and muted colors"; inspirations for the style came from Frans Hals and Velázquez.

Studio Interior, c. 1882 Brooklyn Museum, New York City
Chase's studio conveyed the sophisticated, worldly image he wanted to project. This rendering of it gives examples of the brilliant colors and bravura brushwork he could use. Near the center is a copy of Malle Babbe by Frans Hals, a painter Chase revered. Contrasting textures can be seen throughout the painting, as for instance between the rougher rug, the woman's softer clothing and the pages of the books (the edges of which are rendered with careful brushstrokes) and the hard, reflective pot at the left, contrasted with the soft, reflective wall hanging and the large green plant; the shelves are full of smaller items of contrasting textures and colors.

A Summer Day, c. 1892, Art Gallery of the University of Rochester, New York
In this pastel on canvas, Chase used "[h]igh-keyed summary colors and rapid Impressionistic strokes" to depict the brilliant sky, wildflowers and ocean. He often painted his daughters exploring the area around his home in Shinnecock, Long Island.

T-Z

Venetian Balcony, 1913, Albrecht-Kemper Museum of Art St. Joseph, Missouri
Painted during Chase's final summer abroad, the painting shows the influence of Impressionism on his work. A student of his from the St. Joseph, Missouri, area urged the St. Joseph Art League to buy the painting, which became the first piece in the collection that later became the Albrecht-Kemper Museum of Art.

The White Rose, c. 1886, Phoenix Art Museum, Arizona
The figure, Josephine Jessup, was a student of the artist. The entire work was drawn in pastel, which takes much longer than painting, so pastel pictures tend to be small, yet this work is life-size and almost six feet in height.

Woman in Spanish Shawl (Alice), 1879, Wake Forest University Fine Arts Gallery, Winston-Salem, North Carolina
The painting is a portrait of his wife Alice Gerson Chase.

Young Girl, c. 1900, Bruce Museum, Greenwich, Connecticut
A demonstration piece executed before a class, probably for students at the New York School of Art (given the date). Chase typically took an hour for these paintings and gave them away as prizes to students for good work. The artist concentrated his efforts on the sitter's head to get a "sensitive and expressive portrayal" with minimal brushwork. Dabs of unmixed paint are used to portray the effects of light. The lower end of the painting is unfinished, with exuberant, curving strokes.

Chronological listing

1870s and before

1880s

1890s

1900-1909

1910 and after

Undated

List of works by current location

Northeast United States

New York City
Metropolitan Museum of Art:
At the Seaside, c. 1892
Mrs. Chase in Prospect Park, 1886

Brooklyn Museum:
The Antiquary Shop, 1879
Still Life, Fish, 1912
Lydia Field Emmet, 1892
Carll H. de Silver, c. 1909
The Moorish Warrior, c. 1878
Girl in a Japanese Costume
Studio Interior, c. 1882

Elsewhere in New York City:
At Her Ease, National Academy of Design

Elsewhere in New York state
In the Studio Corner, c. 1881, Canajoharie Library and Art Gallery, Canajoharie
Landscape, Near Coney Island, c. 1886, Hyde Collection Art Museum, Glens Falls

Art Gallery of the University of Rochester:
A Summer Day
Along the Canal

Parrish Art Museum, Southampton:
The Blue Kimono, 1898The Bayberry BushAlice in Shinnecock Studio, 1909The Pot Hunter, 1894The Golden Lady, 1896Still Life With Fruit, 1871Prospect Park, Brooklyn, 1887Untitled (Shinnecock Landscape) c. 1892

New Jersey, Pennsylvania
Pennsylvania:My Palette, Reading Public Museum, Reading

Carnegie Museum of Art, Pittsburgh:Mrs. Chase, 1890–1895Tenth Street Studio, c. 1880-1881, and c. 1910

Westmoreland Museum of American Art, Greensburg:Lady in a Pink Dress, c. 1892Portrait of Henry Wolf, c. 1900

Pennsylvania Academy of the Fine Arts, Philadelphia:The Jester: Preparatory drawing for the painting "Keying Up" — The Court Jester, c. 1875"Keying Up" — The Court Jester, 1875Portrait of Mrs. C. (Lady with a White Shawl), 1893Still Life, Fish, c. 1903Autumn Still LifePhiladelphia Museum of ArtCourtyard in Venice, 1877Portrait of a Lady in Black (Anna Traquair Lang), 1911Portrait of a Lady, c. 1915The Unknown Dane, c. 1876Portrait of a Young Girl (daughter of Karl Theodore von Piloty) c. 1877

New Jersey:Landscape: Shinnecock, Long Island, Princeton University Art Museum, PrincetonA Tambourine Player, c. 1886, Montclair Art Museum, Montclair

Boston and Cambridge, Massachusetts
Museum of Fine Arts, Boston:Sunlight and Shadow, Shinnecock Hills, c. 1895Still Life — Fish, c. 1900Gray Day on the Lagoon, c. 1877Park Bench, c. 1890A Modern Magdalen, c. 1888Spanish bull-fighter (etching, dry-point)Henry W. Longfellow (etching, dry-point), 1882The Court Jester (etching)

Fogg Art Museum, Harvard University, Cambridge:Edward Everett HaleWoman Standing in a LandscapeElsewhere in New EnglandTompkins Park, Brooklyn, 1887, Colby College Museum of Art, Waterville, MainePortrait of Master Otis Barton and his Grandfather, 1903, Currier Museum of Art, Manchester, New HampshirePortrait of the Lady in Pink (Mrs. Leslie Cotton), c. 1888-89, Museum of the Rhode Island School of Design, Providence, Rhode IslandThe Lone Fisherman, 1890s, Hood Museum of Art, Dartmouth College, Hanover, New HampshireYoung Girl, c. 1900, Bruce Museum, Greenwich, ConnecticutGeneral James Watson Webb, 1880 Shelburne Museum, Shelburne, VermontMrs. James Watson Webb (Laura Virginia Cram), c. 1880 Shelburne Museum, Shelburne, Vermont

Washington, D.C.
Hirshhorn Museum and Sculpture Garden:Good Friends, c. 1909Harbor Scene, c. 1895In The Studio, c. 1892-1893Portrait of a Girl, 1903Portrait of Artist's Daughter, c. 1895Portrait of Mrs. William Merritt Chase, c. 1890The Pink Bow (Portrait of Alice Dieudonnee Chase), c. 1898Artist's Daughter in Mother's Dress (Young Girl in Black), c. 1899

National Gallery of Art:A Friendly Call, 1895Nude, c. 1901Self-Portrait, c. 1884The Fairy Tale, 1892Reflections, 1893Girl in White, c. 1890Shinnecock Hills, c. 1895

The Phillips Collection:Florence, undatedHide and Seek, 1888

Smithsonian American Art MuseumSt. Jerome (copy after Rembrandt), c. 1872-1879Terrace, Prospect Park, c. 1887Self-PortraitMaryland
Washington County Museum of Fine Arts, Hagerstown:Fish, Plate, and Copper Container, c. 1910

Midwest United StatesMrs. Chase and Cosy, Sheldon Museum of Art, Lincoln, NebraskaSunlight and Shadow, 1884, Joslyn Art Museum, Omaha, NebraskaThe Opera Cloak, c. 1890, Grand Rapids Museum of Art, MichiganThe Patrician, 1875, Minneapolis Institute of Arts, MinnesotaVenetian Balcony, 1913, Albrecht-Kemper Museum of Art, St. Joseph, MissouriLandscape, c. 1885, Wright Museum of Art at Beloit College, Wisconsin

Chicago, Illinois
Art Institute of Chicago:A City ParkTerra Museum of American Art:Ready for a Walk: Beatrice Clough Bachmann, c. 1885Alice Dieudonnée, c. 1892Portrait of Alice Gerson by 1886Morning at Breakwater, Shinnecock, c. 1897Spring Flowers (Peonies), by 1889Hall at Shinnecock, 1892Shinnecock Studio Interior, 1892The Olive Grove, c. 1910Self-Portrait, c. 1915Sketch of a Man, Whistling, undatedPortrait Sketch of a Woman with Mantilla, undated

Smart Museum of Art, University of Chicago:Myra Reynolds, late 19th centuryPortrait of a Man, c. 1875

IndianaSelf-portrait: The Artist in his Studio, Richmond Art Museum, RichmondPortrait of Miss B., Richmond Art Museum, RichmondStill Life Urns and Red Peppers, c. 1895, Swope Art Museum, Terre HautePeonies, c. 1903, Lilly Endowment, Inc., IndianapolisShinnecock Hills, Long Island, c. 1895, Lilly Endowment, Inc., IndianapolisSummertime (Pulling for Shore), c. 1886, Lilly Endowment, Inc., IndianapolisWash Day (Washing Day—a Backyard Reminiscence), c. 1886, Lilly Endowment, Inc., IndianapolisMy Daughter, Snite Museum of Art, Notre Dame

 Michigan 

 Detroit Institute of Arts 
 Lydia Field Emmet, c. 1892
 Mrs. William Merritt Chase, c. 1890
 Portrait of a Lady in Black, c. 1895
 My Little Daughter Dorothy, c. 1894
 Self Portrait, c. 1914
 Shinnecock Hills Landscape, c. 1890–1895
 The Yield of the Waters, 1878

 Kalamazoo Institute of Arts 
 A Study in Pink(Mrs. Robert McDougal), 1895

 University of Michigan Museum of Art 

 Doorway and Garden Wall, year unknown
 View of the Brooklyn Navy Yard, 1886–1890

OhioSummer At Shinnecock Hills, 1891, Cincinnati Art MuseumThe Open Air Breakfast, 1888, Toledo Museum of ArtDid You Speak to Me?, 1897, Butler Institute of American Art, Youngstown

Cleveland
Cleveland Museum of Art:Portrait of My Daughter Alice, c. 1895Head of a BoyDora Wheeler, 1882–1883Shinnecock Hills, 1895Seascape, 1890sRepair Docks, Gowanus Bay, c. 1870-1885The Jester, c. 1890

Southern United States
OklahomaThe Blue Kimono, Philbrook Museum of Art, TulsaVenice, 1877, Oklahoma City Museum of ArtPortrait of a Young Lady, Mabee-Gerrer Museum of Art, Shawnee

TexasDuveneck in His Studio, San Antonio Art League MuseumMother and Child (The First Portrait), c. 1888, Museum of Fine Arts, HoustonSunlight and Shadow, Shinnecock Hills, c. 1895, Museum of Fine Arts, HoustonIdle Hours, c. 1894, Amon Carter Museum, Fort Worth

Virginia
Maier Museum of Art at Randolph College, Lynchburg:Portrait of President William Waugh Smith, 1907The Roycrofter — Portrait of Elbert Hubbard, c. 1902The Deserted Beach, 1907Portrait of an Elderly Woman, 1907

Elsewhere:An Italian Garden, c. 1909, Chrysler Museum of Art, Norfolk

ElsewhereGirl With Book, Montgomery Museum of Fine Arts, AlabamaStill Life - Fish, The Parthenon, Nashville, TennesseeStill Life with Watermelon, 1869, Birmingham Museum of Art, AlabamaMarianne Heyward Taylor, c. 1902-06, Columbia Museum of Art, South CarolinaWoman in Spanish Shawl (Alice), Wake Forest University Fine Arts Gallery, Winston-Salem, North Carolina

Western United States
Los Angeles County Museum of Art:Pablo de Sarasate: Portrait of a Violinist, c. 1875Sketch for a Picture — Columbus before the Council of Salamanca (A), c. 1876Sketch for a Picture — Columbus before the Council of Salamanca (B), c. 1876Just Onions (Onions; Still Life), 1912

Montana Museum of Art and Culture, Missoula:Portrait of Fra Dana, 1897PriamElsewhere:The White Rose, c. 1886, Phoenix Art Museum, ArizonaStill Life: Cod and Mackerel, c. 1885, National Museum of Wildlife Art, Jackson Hole, WyomingHarriet Hubbard Ayer, 1880, De Young Museum, San Francisco

Outside the United States
Thyssen-Bornemisza Museum, Madrid, Spain:The Kimono, c. 1895Shinnecock Hills, 1893–1897In the Park. A By-path, c. 1890

Elsewhere:Self-portrait'', 1908, State Museums of Florence, Italy

Notes and references
Items on the lists above largely come from the Artcyclopedia Web site.

External links

 Artcyclopedia page
 Athenaeum website list of Chase artwork

Chase, William Merritt
American Impressionism